Freewheeling opportunism is a concept that suggests a company does not need formal business planning instead it should remain open to opportunities as they arise and led by market conditions  and events therefore adapting to changes required to take advantage of the environment to create competitive advantage.

This type of policy may be difficult to sustain as there is no certainty of the opportunities presenting themselves to the company. If the company has no plan, how can it know which opportunity should be its emergent strategy  and how will it fit with existing resources and provide returns.

In this model there is no formal approach to strategy development. Directors dictate the business direction through taking whatever opportunities are available at a particular point in time. This allows the business to be very flexible and take opportunities that companies using a more formal approach to strategy Porter's generic strategies development would be slow to take.

Freewheeling opportunism suggests firms should not bother with strategic plans and should exploit opportunities as they arise. Risk is that organizations fail to identify possible opportunities but don't get slowed down in formal planning Strategic planning.

References

Opportunism